Elk Grove Village is a village in Cook and DuPage counties in the U.S. state of Illinois. Per the 2020 census, the population was 32,812. It is directly adjacent to O'Hare International Airport and is economically important to the Chicago metropolitan area due to its large industrial park, located on the eastern border of the village. The community is served by several Interstate highways including I-90, I-290/I-355/Route 53, and IL-390. Elk Grove is also expected to be served by the I-490 Western O'Hare Bypass upon completion of the project.

History
The land that is now the Village of Elk Grove was controlled by the Miami Confederacy (which contained the Illini and Kickapoo tribes) starting in the early 1680s. The Confederacy was driven from the area by the Iroquois and Fox in the early 1700s.

The French-allied Potawatomi began to raid and take possession of Northern Illinois in the 1700s. In the late 1700s and early 1800s, the Potawatomi expanded southwards from their territory in Green Bay and westward from their holdings near Detroit, until they controlled in an L-shaped swath of territory from Green Bay to the Illinois River, and from the Mississippi River to the Maumee River.

In 1833, the Potawatomi signed the 1833 Treaty of Chicago with the United States Government. As a result of the Treaty, the United States was granted control of all land west of Lake Michigan and east of Lake Winnebago in exchange for a tract of land west of the Mississippi. The land that is now Elk Grove was ceded to the U.S. in this treaty, which sparked mass white immigration to the Northern Illinois area. The U.S. Government purchased the land for about 15 cents per acre, and then resold it to white settlers for 1.25 dollars per acre.

Aaron Miner, a revolutionary war veteran, moved to what is now in Elk Grove in 1833. He maintained friendly relations with the remaining Potawatomi, who gave him a firebrand. His wife and daughter often baked cookies which they would trade with the Potawatomi for venison and game.

The village was formally incorporated in 1956 in Elk Grove Township, and was founded as a planned suburban community. The majority of houses were constructed by Centex Corporation. As part of the original planning concept, the village was to be home to separated residential and industrial areas (the latter of which would later become the largest industrial park in the United States).

Prior to its development as a residential community, it was home to many farmers and their families (mostly German immigrants). Many of the major streets in and around the village are named for these farmers. Busse Farm was the final undeveloped agricultural property in the village, located between Higgins Road and Oakton Street, and was at one time considered as a location for a new Chicago Bears stadium, to replace the aging Soldier Field. In 2018 the land was sold to be developed into the Elk Grove Technology Park.

The original boundaries of Elk Grove Village's residential area were Higgins Road (Illinois Route 72) on the north, State Road (now Arlington Heights Road) on the west, Landmeier Road on the south, and Wildwood Road on the east. The village easily doubled in size during the 1960s. By the end of the decade, most of the land between O'Hare Airport and I-290/IL-53 was developed. As the village expanded to the south and west, new roads, schools, and parks were added to the community. Rupley Elementary was the first school to be constructed in Elk Grove Village. It was named after Ira Rupley, an executive vice president at Centex who helped lead the early development of the village.

In the 1970s, the village developed land west of the expressway in Schaumburg Township along with industrial development into Addison Township. New apartment communities were constructed in Elk Grove Village along Tonne Road and Ridge Avenue. These developments have since been sectioned, and some converted to condominium homes. The village saw continuous residential, commercial, and industrial growth during the 1980s. However, Lively Junior High School was no longer necessary and saw fast-declining enrollment numbers. It was shut down by the school district, leased to Elk Grove Park District, and remodeled to become the Jack E. Claes Pavilion Recreation Facility. School District 59 built administrative offices at the site.

In 1982, Elk Grove Village was briefly in the national spotlight with one of the first reported deaths in the Chicago Tylenol murders case with the death of 12-year-old Mary Kellerman, who died after taking a Tylenol capsule that was laced with potassium cyanide. The case led to the development of more stringent FDA regulations around tamper-evident technology.

In the 1990s and 2000s, the village embarked on a series of beautification and redevelopment programs which included the installation of a clock tower at Village Hall, installation of brick-paved crosswalks in residential areas, new landscaping in boulevards and other public lands, and installation of retro-themed street lights.

In 2006, Elk Grove Village became one of the first municipalities in Illinois to enact a public smoking ban, and in 2008 became one of the first Chicago suburbs to use red light cameras. In June 2010, Elk Grove Village's Municipal Administration and Public Safety Complex was LEED Gold Certified by the US Green Building Council.

Economy

Elk Grove Village is home to the largest consolidated business park in North America. There are nearly 3,600 businesses operating in the Village's  business park along the western edge of O'Hare International Airport, employing nearly 100,000 persons. In 2018, the business park became the title sponsor of the Bahamas Bowl college football bowl game, making it officially the Makers Wanted Bahamas Bowl after the business park's advertising slogan, "Makers Wanted".

The Elk Grove business park is home to the largest concentration of manufacturers in the Midwest; the largest concentration of logistic freight companies in the United States, and the second-largest source of manufacturing in Illinois behind only the City of Chicago.  The village is home to many large data centers which rely upon the convergence of national fiber optic networks and natural gas lines in Elk Grove, which has other strategic advantages for business including the convergence of national fiber optic cables, national gasoline and oil pipelines, and a virtually unlimited supply of fresh water from Lake Michigan.

Elk Grove Village is home to Alexian Brothers Medical Center (ABMC) hospital, which is the largest employer in the community with over 2,200 workers. There are a number of other well-known corporations including Apple Vacations, the American Academy of Pediatrics, Illinois Tool Works (ITW), ADP, CitiGroup, Norman Distribution, Symons, and Pepsi Cola Distribution.

In 2014, the city launched a new website to serve as an online oasis for all things business related in the city. Current and prospective businesses and real estate professionals can access tools and resources for recruitment resources, work referrals, job requests and more. Those that own or work for a business within Elk Grove qualify for a free membership and profile.

On December 30, 2014, Global Trade Magazine named Elk Grove Village one of America's best cities for global trade.

Top employers
According to the village's 2018 Comprehensive Annual Financial Report, the top employers in the village are:

Geography
Central Elk Grove Village is located at  (42.003178, −87.996418). The geographic confluence point of 42°N and 88°W is also located within the village, on Brantwood Avenue.

Education

Residents of Elk Grove Village enjoy a high quality of education. Areas east of I-290 are served by Elk Grove High School (which is a part of Illinois High School District 214) and Elk Grove Township Elementary School District 59. Areas west of I-290 are served by James B. Conant High School which is part of Township High School District 211 and Mead Junior High which is part of Community Consolidated School District 54. Queen of the Rosary Catholic School is located in Elk Grove Village and was named by Chicago magazine in 2014 as one of the top 25 private elementary schools in the Chicago area. Elk Grove Village has many other national and state award-winning schools and instructors.

Schools in Elk Grove Village:

Elementary schools:
 Adlai Stevenson Elementary
 Admiral Byrd Elementary
 Adolph Link Elementary. Top 10 Illinois Blue Ribbon Public Schools (2018–19)
 Clearmont Elementary
 Nerge Elementary (in Roselle, serving the far west side of Elk Grove Village)
 Ridge Family Center for Learning
 Rupley Elementary
 Salt Creek Elementary
 Queen of the Rosary
 Sterling Central

Middle schools:
 Margaret Mead
 Grove Jr. High
 Queen of the Rosary

High schools:
 Elk Grove High School. Principal Paul Kelly named 2018 Illinois High School Principal of the Year.
 James Conant High School (in Hoffman Estates, serving the West Side of Elk Grove Village)
 Prairie Lake
 Sterling Central

Demographics
As of the 2020 census there were 32,812 people, 12,835 households, and 8,870 families residing in the village. The racial makeup of the village was 73.30% White, 12.04% Asian, 1.89% African American, 0.48% Native American, 0.02% Pacific Islander, 4.93% from other races, and 7.34% from two or more races. Hispanic or Latino of any race were 12.16% of the population.

There were 12,835 households, out of which 47.02% had children under the age of 18 living with them, 55.75% were married couples living together, 9.47% had a female householder with no husband present, and 30.89% were non-families. 27.71% of all households were made up of individuals, and 13.77% had someone living alone who was 65 years of age or older. The average household size was 3.09 and the average family size was 2.51.

The village's age distribution consisted of 20.2% under the age of 18, 6.6% from 18 to 24, 24.8% from 25 to 44, 28.8% from 45 to 64, and 19.7% who were 65 years of age or older. The median age was 43.6 years. For every 100 females, there were 90.9 males. For every 100 females age 18 and over, there were 90.7 males.

The median income for a household in the village was $85,240, and the median income for a family was $105,398. Males had a median income of $62,607 versus $44,059 for females. The per capita income for the village was $41,703. About 3.0% of families and 4.0% of the population were below the poverty line, including 6.0% of those under age 18 and 3.3% of those age 65 or over.

Note: the US Census treats Hispanic/Latino as an ethnic category. This table excludes Latinos from the racial categories and assigns them to a separate category. Hispanics/Latinos can be of any race.

Culture

Media
The area metropolitan newspapers are the Chicago Tribune and the Chicago Sun-Times. Elk Grove Village is also served by the Daily Herald and Journal & Topics Media Group, publishers of the weekly Elk Grove Journal and the monthly Elk Grove Business Journal.

Religion
The Roman Catholic Archdiocese of Chicago operates the area's Catholic churches. On July 1, 2020, St. Julian Eymard Parish and Queen of the Rosary Parish will merge, with the latter having both the combined church and the school.

Sports
In July 2018, the village, as part of its "Makers Wanted" campaign announced that they would be taking over its naming rights sponsorship of the Bahamas Bowl beginning with its 2018 edition of the bowl; replacing the Popeyes Louisiana Kitchen restaurant franchise as their naming rights sponsor.

Elk
As the name suggests, Elk Grove Village is home to a small herd of elk kept in a grove at the eastern edge of the Busse Woods forest preserve for which the grove is named. Elk were originally native to the area (and most of the Eastern United States) but had been extirpated by the early 1800s. The tradition of the Elk Grove herd began when elk were brought by train from Montana by an early resident, William Busse, in the 1920s. The elk are currently maintained by the Chicago Zoological Society veterinary staff and the Busse Woods Forest Preserve wildlife biologists.

Notable people

 Robert L. Baird, jockey
 Jessica Calalang, figure skater, 2020 U.S. Figure Skating Championships silver medalist and 2020 ISU Skate America silver medalist in pair skating 
 Billy Corgan, lead singer and guitarist for rock band Smashing Pumpkins
 Dave Cullen, author
 Stephanie Faracy, actress
 Sarah Gorden, current National Women's Soccer League player with the Chicago Red Stars
 Les Grobstein, sports radio host
 Kelli Hubly, current National Women's Soccer League player with the Portland Thorns FC
 James Iha, Guitarist for Smashing Pumpkins, and A Perfect Circle
 Steven Kazmierczak, perpetrator of the Northern Illinois University shooting
 Jerry B. Jenkins, co-author of the Left Behind series
 Bill Kelly, screenwriter; born and raised in Elk Grove Village
 Irene Kotowicz, former All-American Girls Professional Baseball League player
 John Kotz, basketball player on Wisconsin's 1941 NCAA championship team
 John Loprieno, actor (One Life to Live)
 John McDonough, former president of the Chicago Blackhawks and the Chicago Cubs
 Katie Naughton, current National Women's Soccer League player with the Chicago Red Stars
 Dave Otto, former Major League Baseball player and Chicago Cubs and ESPN broadcast analyst
 Ailyn Pérez, American operatic soprano and the winner of the 2012 Richard Tucker Award
 Erin Walter, former USL W-League player

Sister cities
  Termini Imerese, Sicily, Italy

References

Colby, Nancy, Behnke Kelly. Elk Grove Village (Images of America: Illinois), Arcadia Publishing (September 29, 2008)

External links

Elk Grove Village official website
One Village, Two Crimes (Patty Columbo and Nola Jean Weaver murder cases)
Elk Grove History (1884)

 
Chicago metropolitan area
Populated places established in 1956
Villages in Cook County, Illinois
Villages in DuPage County, Illinois
Villages in Illinois
1956 establishments in Illinois